Fred Woodward (1899 – 1963) was an English professional footballer who played as a wing half. He made three appearances in the Football League for Wigan Borough.

Senior career
Born in Ashton-under-Lyne, Lancashire, Woodworth started his career with Burnley but was unable to break into the senior team at the First Division club. In the summer of 1921, Woodward transferred to Wigan Borough in the newly formed Third Division North. He made his professional debut in the 2–1 win over Nelson at Seedhill on 27 August 1921 and went on to make a further two league appearances for Wigan Borough during the 1921–22 campaign. His final league match for the club came on 8 October in the 4–2 victory against Walsall at Springfield Park. Although Woodward was not selected for another competitive game, he remained with Wigan until the end of the season and featured in several Lancashire Senior Cup ties as the team progressed to the Second Round before being eliminated by Stockport County.

Career statistics

See also
 List of Wigan Borough F.C. players

Sources

References

1899 births
1963 deaths
Footballers from Ashton-under-Lyne
English footballers
Association football wing halves
Burnley F.C. players
Wigan Borough F.C. players
English Football League players